In France, a  ("Railway of Local Interest"), abbreviated VFIL, is a secondary railway constructed by a local administrative division, serving sparsely populated rural areas.

Birth

The Prefect of the Bas-Rhin department, Monsieur Migneret, invented the VFIL concept. The first VFILs saw the light of day in Bas-Rhin in 1859, when the Act of 21 May 1836 came into force, defining the prefecture's powers over highways. This economical mode of transport piqued the interest of other departments, and became the object of an inquiry that led to a law being enacted on 12 July 1865. This act authorised departments and communes to implement VFILs, either themselves or through concessions, with the State's assistance and control. Local bodies had a great deal of autonomy over both technical and financial planning. But the system was open to abuse: the law, in providing State subsidies of start-up capital, encouraged speculation; in many cases, schemes started with this capital were later abandoned because of technical difficulties.

The State had to restore good order to an anarchic situation and, in 1878, Charles de Freycinet, the new Minister of Public Works, gave France a vision of a comprehensive system of railways. He introduced rail transport, if not to every chef-lieu, at least to the regions still unconnected by train. De Freycinet then commissioned a two-part plan, known as the Plan Freycinet:
 Plan B, never enacted, listed the  concessions made under the provisions of the law of 12 July 1865, and their integration with the larger networks. These provisions did nothing to address regulated routes either planned or imagined by the departments to provide secondary connections (broadly, branch line service).

Rise and fall

To breathe new life into VFILs, it was necessary to enact a new law clarifying the situation. This act became law on 11 June 1880 and fixed problems with State subsidies, guaranteeing, under certain conditions, to regulate the connections with the Big Companies.

This expansion was somewhat anarchic, and once again it became being necessary to change legislation so that it encompassed both railways proper and tramways that ran on normal streets. This was done with the law of 31 July 1913, designating them both under the name VFIL and establishing a new, more-logical classification distinguishing railways and urban tramways.

The Inter-war period saw new laws (of 1 October 1926 and 17 April 1927, for example) which, with their measures of decentralisation and removal of red tape, tried to ease the financial difficulties of companies already closing their lines and often replacing them with road transport.

Though the VFILs made up a baby boom, their lives were brief; only two or three generations will ever have seen them in use. In 1928 the various networks were at their largest, . In the Second World War many lines closed, victims of both the road and their own slowness. Not long after the end of the war, from the early 1950s, the survivors fell one by one. But a few still survive, sometimes as heritage railways such as the Chemin de Fer de la baie de Somme.

The development of secondary railways happened at the same time throughout Europe. In Belgium, the SNCV created infrastructure and rolling stock to respond to the same need, but they evolved differently for many different reasons (construction by a single national body, the higher population density, a greater number of connections, partial electrification, and so on) and their development culminated around 1950.

Minimal cost

On the secondary railways, everything was designed to save money, which did not necessarily entail poor workmanship or mediocre service.

To keep construction costs down, routes followed the terrain as much as possible, with gradients as steep as 1:22.22 (4.5%) to 1:20 (5%) compared to no more than 1:40 (2.5%) on more traditional lines, with the exception of some mountain railways. The rail tracks used were very light; generally  Vignoles rail, with mass being  depending on the distance. In many cases, lines were laid over road shoulders, which reduced the need to buy land and, above all, limited the need for new bridges and tunnels.

Signalling was itself minimal because of the small number of journeys (generally six a day before the First World War, and a few infrequent freight trains each week, fewer after 1914). Road users were warned of level crossings by simple traffic signs saying , which in the 1930s were augmented by the Cross of St Andrew; never a barrier. Stations were built in the same style, of small dimensions: a little waiting room and, attached to it, a modest ticket hall leading to a platform long enough to serve the most populous locality. A simple shelter or just a signpost marked out halts or flag stops.

Small trains

The locomotives and other rolling stock also had a scaled-down appearance when compared with those of the larger networks. The steam locomotives were often tank engines, generally having  three axles, with or without Bissel bogies front or rear. They were comparatively light, weighing from  unladen. Later, petrol and diesel multiple units appeared as railbuses. Overall, these machines formed short trains of at most about a dozen small carriages or wagons, often far fewer.

Routes were quite short, some tens of kilometres, with operational speed below . The slowness and rudimentary comfort of the secondary railways have passed into folk stories; anecdotes abound of unsavoury episodes, passengers getting off the train to push it up a steep hill, children hot-wiring cars to run alongside the breathing machine. Their users gave them nicknames:  ("twisters"),  ("bangers"),  ("cuckoos"),  (imitative, as on the Boisleux Marquion line), and so on.

Author Marcel Proust refers often to one such train service in his novel Within a Budding Grove, always using the full phrase "le petit chemin de fer d'intérêt local" in French, literally translated as "the little train of local interest".

See also
 Branch line
 Main French railcar builders\: Établissements Billard • De Dion-Bouton
 Main French VFIL locomotive builders: Corpet-Louvet • Pinguely
 Narrow gauge railway

Notes

References

Sources

 
 
 
 
 
 
 

Defunct railroads
Narrow gauge railways in France
Metre gauge railways in France
Railway lines in France